Becoming X is the debut studio album by English electronic band Sneaker Pimps. It was first released on 19 August 1996 in the United Kingdom by Clean Up Records and on 25 February 1997 in the United States by Virgin Records. The album marked the only appearance of Kelli Dayton as lead singer before she was asked to leave the band; Chris Corner replaced her for the band's subsequent albums.

Becoming X was commercially successful in the United Kingdom, while "6 Underground" and "Spin Spin Sugar" would become hits in the United States. Fueled by the success of the former single, the album spent 23 consecutive weeks on the US Billboard 200.

Background and recording 
Becoming X is an electronica and trip hop album, featuring alternative rock and orchestral elements and samples. The title comes from the fourth track on the album and, as explained by vocalist Kelli Dayton, "X meaning whatever you want it to mean. Also like generation X, X as a blank. It's a feeling. So it's really purposefully ambiguous, like the songs are. We've tried letting people use their imagination to make it more personal to them." This concept was later referenced into the name of Chris Corner's solo project IAMX.

The album was written by Corner and Liam Howe, with friend Ian Pickering contributing to the lyrics in what Corner calls "a total collaboration". The album's demos were recorded with Corner on vocals. However, the band felt the songs would work better with a female voice, so the band's manager and co-founder of the Clean Up label, Craig Mineard, sent the demos to Dayton, asking her to join the band as vocalist. Dayton liked the demos and agreed to join the band, on the condition of becoming a song-writing partner. As much of the writing for the album was already in place, Dayton went on to co-write the b-sides.

The album was recorded in Howe's bedroom studio in Elwick. The vocals were recorded in a cupboard that Howe made into a vocal booth. Possessing a higher vocal range than Corner, Dayton decided to record the tracks' vocals in a measured and subdued way to give them more emotional intensity.

Release and promotion 
Various iterations of the record exist with different artwork and track mixes. The first version features a cover with metal circuitry designed by Foxy Design and was released in UK and Europe on 19 August 1996, on vinyl, CD and cassette by Clean Up Records. The album was released in US on 25 February 1997 by Virgin featuring the Nellee Hooper remix of "6 Underground" as bonus track.

Due to the success of the singles "6 Underground" and "Spin Spin Sugar", the album was reissued in 1997 with artwork by Stéphane Sednaoui. The reissue, referred to as the limited edition, features the Nellee Hooper remix of "6 Underground", the radio mix of "Spin Spin Sugar" and the Flight From Nashville mix of "Post-Modern Sleaze". This is the version provided on streaming platforms. The limited edition track listing was used for the 2008, 2016 and 2020 vinyl reissues of the album, although the original 1996 artwork was supplied instead of the Limited Edition artwork. This caused confusion, but One Little Independent Records insisted it was correct when it indeed was an error.

Five singles were released from the album: "Tesko Suicide", "Roll On" and "6 Underground" in 1996, and "Spin Spin Sugar" and "Post-Modern Sleaze" in 1997. Music videos were made for the tracks "Tesko Suicide", directed by Liam Howe and Joe Wilson, "Six Underground" and "Spin Spin Sugar", both directed by Toby Tremlett, and "Post-Modern Sleaze", directed by Howard Greenhalgh. The videos were later released on the 2001 video compilation The Videos on DVD.

The band embarked on a tour of the UK in small venues and worked their way up to a two-year world tour to promote the album, also appearing on music festivals and TV shows. During their tour, they opened for Blur and Neneh Cherry, and played with Tricky and Lamb, establishing themselves as a trip hop band. The band's popularity was cemented when "6 Underground" was included on the soundtrack of the 1997 film The Saint, out on 4 April. On 22 July 1997, the band featured on the Marilyn Manson track "Long Hard Road Out of Hell", included in the motion picture Spawn. In October, the band opened for Aphex Twin on his United States tour promoting the Richard D. James Album. The United States tour put a strain on the relationships in the band, leading to Howe prematurely leaving the tour, the tour itself stopping, and the subsequent firing of singer Kelli Ali, who wouldn't appear on the band's second album Splinter.

On 19 August 2022, the band began "a month of song and video celebrations" on their YouTube channel to mark the 26th anniversary of the release of the album.

Critical reception 

Becoming X got mostly positive reviews from contemporary critics, who often compared Sneaker Pimps to trip hop artists like Portishead and Tricky.

In a positive interview for AllMusic, Stephen Thomas Erlewine defined the album "one of the most engaging byproducts of post-Portishead trip-hop", albeit being more guitar-driven than their predecessors. Jeremy Helligar wrote "Sneaker Pimps manage to be ominously spooky on Becoming X without indulging in Tricky’s gothic pretension and hypnotic without lapsing into Portishead’s one-note gloom" in his positive review for Entertainment Weekly. In a 3 star out of 5 review for Rolling Stone, Ken Micallef wrote that whilst not deviating from the female-fronted trip hop band formula, the band manages to "make pop as tension-filled as an Edgar Allan Poe novel". Calvin Bush from Muzik gave the album 3 stars out of 5 and defined it "spiky indie pop in a Garbage-meets-Portishead fashion", noting the singles "Tesko Suicide" and "6 Underground" came across like "an indie kid version of Morcheeba with slashier guitars". Ryan Schreiber gave the album a 6.3 score on Pitchfork, likening Sneaker Pimps to "an electrified version of Sade" and praising the vocals, the beats and the guitars, albeit criticizing the songs for seemingly losing "a lot of their appeal once you're familiar with them".

In a more critical review for NME, Dele Fadele commended the band's original sound for blending electronic, orchestral and rock elements but ultimately described the result as boring.

Track listing

"6 Underground (Nellee Hooper Edit)" − 3:48 (US bonus track)
"No More" – 4:15 (Japan bonus track)
"Clean" – 5:17 (Japan bonus track)
"Johnny" 4:14 (Japan bonus track)
"Precious" 4:18 (Japan bonus track)

"Walk the Rain" – 4:58 (Japan bonus track)

Samples
 "6 Underground" sampled John Barry's track "Golden Girl" from the film Goldfinger (1964)
 "Becoming X" sampled Sandy Denny's track "Next Time Around" (1971)
"Spin Spin Sugar" sampled Luciano Berio's "Visage" (1961)
 "Post-Modern Sleaze" sampled the ritual music from the final scenes of the film The Wicker Man (1973)
 "Waterbaby" sampled David Sylvian's track "Let the Happiness In" (1987), "Guru Sri Chinmoy Aphorism" by Carlos Santana and Alice Coltrane (1974) and Jimmy Fontana's track "Il Mondo" (1965)
 "How Do" sampled the Rachel Verney vocal audio from the soundtrack in the 1973 British horror film The Wicker Man 
 Live versions of "Spin Spin Sugar" often sampled Kraftwerk's track "Boing Boom Tschak" (1986)
 "Can't Find My Way Home", the B-side to "6 Underground" sampled John Martyn's track "Go Down Easy" (1973)
 The demo version of "Low Place Like Home" sampled David Sylvian's tracks "Before the Bullfight" and "Wave" (1986)

Personnel

Sneaker Pimps
Kelli Dayton − vocals, guitars
Chris Corner − guitars, keyboards
Liam Howe − production, keyboards, guitars, drums, samples, percussion, programming
Joe Wilson − bass, keyboards
Dave Westlake − drums, programming
Ian Pickering – lyrics, keyboards

Other personnel
Jim Abbiss, C. Goddard, Flood, Oggy AKA Augustus Skinner, Luke Gifford − engineering
Mark "Spike" Stent, Flood, Jim Abbiss, Line of Flight, Nellee Hooper, Luke Gifford − mixing
Andy Wright, Marius De Vries − additional programming and keyboards

Charts

Certifications

References

External links

Becoming X at Sneaker Pimps Legacy

Sneaker Pimps albums
1996 debut albums
Albums produced by Flood (producer)
Albums produced by Peter Collins (record producer)
Albums produced by Jim Abbiss
Alternative rock albums by English artists
Downtempo albums
Industrial rock albums